Michael Lenis (born October 12, 2003) is an American professional soccer player who plays as a defender for USL Championship club Sporting Kansas City II.

Club career
Born in Weston, Florida, Lenis began his career with local U.S. Soccer Development Academy club Weston FC. In 2017, Lenis moved to Kansas City, his mother's hometown, and joined the youth setup at Sporting Kansas City. He progressed through the ranks of the academy, representing the club at the under-17 and under-19 levels. On April 30, 2021, it was announced that Lenis, alongside seven other academy players, had signed a USL academy contract which would allow him to play with Sporting Kansas City II while retaining NCAA eligibility.

Lenis made his senior debut in the USL Championship for Sporting Kansas City II on May 7, 2021 against OKC Energy. He came on as a 68th minute substitute as Sporting Kansas City II drew the match 1–1.

International career
Lenis has been called up by the United States for the under-14 and under-16 levels. He was first selected for the under-14s in February 2017. Lenis was then selected to be part of the U.S. Soccer boy's national team Futures Camp in May 2017. A year later, in June 2018, Lenis was called into the under-16 squad for their training camp in Bradenton, Florida.

Career statistics

References

External links
 Profile at Sporting Kansas City

2003 births
Living people
Sportspeople from Florida
American soccer players
Association football defenders
Sporting Kansas City II players
USL Championship players
Soccer players from Florida